Frank Pilato is a composer, guitarist and clarinetist based in Florence, Italy.

Career
At 29, he replaced Allan Holdsworth in "Stories" trilogy of Maestro Andrea Marcelli.

He represented Italy at the 2015 Berlin Jazz Festival.

His last work, "SPETTRI" was produced from "Regione Toscana" in collaboration with "Toscana 100 bands".

Discography

Solo album 
 2000 – Caprice
 2015 – Stories
 2016 – Spettri
 2020 – Solo

Books 
 2019 – Uncommon Scales, Ideas & Melodic Patters

References

External links 
 Official website
 Interview on Italia di metallo
 Press article on MusicOFF
 Interview for album "Stories" on MusicaJAZZ
 Italian genius musician win the Contest for "Spettri" on Toscana100band
 Review of "Stories" for Truth in shredding
 6th Italian jazz festival in Berlin
 Frank Pilato play "Stories" for Italian jazz festival in Berlin 
 Review of album "SPETTRI"
 Cover of the album "Stories" from the M° Marcelli official website
 Frank Pilato, Gary Willis, Jeff Berlin, Mitchel Forman, Andrea Marcelli article for the new album
 Frank Pilato in M° Marcelli Trilogy All Music
     "review of Spettri ep"

Living people
Italian composers
Italian guitarists
21st-century guitarists
Year of birth missing (living people)